The Schweizer SGS 2-33 is an American two-seat, high-wing, strut-braced, training glider that was built by Schweizer Aircraft of Elmira, New York.

The 2-33 was designed to replace the Schweizer 2-22, from which it was derived. The aircraft first flew in 1965 and production was started in 1967. Production was completed in 1981.

From its introduction until the late 1980s, the 2-33 was the main training glider used in North America.

Background
The SGU 2-22 two-seat training glider was introduced in 1945 and quickly became the most popular training glider in the USA.

By the early 1960s it became obvious to Schweizer Aircraft that a replacement for the 2-22 was needed. At that time the single seat Schweizer SGS 1-26 was becoming very popular for one-design competition flying. The company realized that the new trainer should have similar performance to the 1-26, in order to be used as the 1-26's two seat transition trainer.

SGU 2-22 production was ended at serial number 258 in 1967 to commence production of the new model.

Development
The SGS 2-33, indicating Schweizer Glider, Sailplane, 2 Seats, Model 33, was designed by Ernest Schweizer. The aircraft was a derivative of the 2-22, which in turn was based on the SGU 1-7 single place glider of 1937. The 2-33 retained the 2-22 and 1-7's metal wing, single spar and single strut arrangement.

The 2-33 was manufactured in three variants and remained in production for 14 years. Production was only curtailed when demand dropped off due to the import of higher-performance two-place sailplanes from Europe.

The 2-33 received type certificate G3EA on 10 February 1967.

A number of 2-33s were delivered as kits to the purchaser and designated as SGS 2-33AK. These were accepted by the Federal Aviation Administration as certified aircraft and not amateur-builts, subject to conditions:

The 2-33 type certificate is currently held by K & L Soaring of Cayuta, New York who now provide all parts and support for the Schweizer line of sailplanes.

Design

The 2-33 was designed to be rugged, easy to maintain and with a high degree of crashworthiness.

The 2-33 has a welded steel tube fuselage covered in aircraft fabric. The single-spar, aluminum structure wings are tapered from mid-span and feature top and bottom balanced divebrakes. The wings are covered in aluminum stressed skin. The tailplane and elevator are made from welded steel tube covered in aircraft fabric. The vertical fin is aluminum stressed skin construction, while the rudder is fabric-covered.

The 2-33 has a fiberglass nose cone and a one-piece molded front canopy. Access to the rear seat is via  door on the right-hand side. Instruments are fitted in the front cockpit only. Most 2-33s have a four-position bungee trim system, with aircraft starting with serial number 500 equipped with a "ratchet-lock trim".

Operational history
The United States Air Force Academy operated 13 2-33s as the TG-4A until they were replaced by the TG-10B (L-23 Super Blanik) in 2002. The USAFA TG-4s were all donated to other US government agencies, such as the Civil Air Patrol or to aviation museums.

Under the 1962 United States Tri-Service aircraft designation system the USAF 2-33 was designated as the TG-4A. This can cause confusion with a World War II  training glider made by Laister-Kauffman and used by the United States Army Air Forces from 1941 to 1947. The Laister-Kauffman LK-10B also bore the designation TG-4A, but from an earlier USAAF designation system.

There were 254 SGS 2-33s registered in the US as of November 2017, including:
47 SGS 2-33
206 SGS 2-33A
1 SGS 2-33AK

There were 93 SGS 2-33s registered in Canada as of November 2017, including:
15 SGS 2-33
78 SGS 2-33A

Variants
SGS 2-33
The original 2-33 was certified on 10 February 1967 and includes serial numbers 1 to 85.
 
SGS 2-33A
The "A" model incorporated some minor changes, including a larger rudder with an aerodynamic balance horn. It was certified on 7 March 1968 and includes serial numbers 86 and subsequent. The replacement rudder of the "A" model was available as a retrofit to earlier 2-33s and some have been upgraded to "A" status.

SGS 2-33AK
The "AK" model was an "A" model completed by the buyer from a kit. It was certified on 19 April 1973.

Operators
The SGS 2-33 remains popular with glider schools, the largest operator is the Air Cadet League of Canada with a fleet of 79 2-33s and 2-33As as of 2022.

Aircraft on display
There is a 2-33A on display at the Wings Over the Rockies Air and Space Museum.

Specifications

See also

References

External links

2-33 takeoff video
2-33 takeoff video - cockpit view

1960s United States sailplanes
Schweizer aircraft
Glider aircraft
High-wing aircraft
Aircraft first flown in 1965